"My Love" is a song released in 2008 by American  R&B/Soul singer/songwriter Jill Scott from her album, The Real Thing: Words and Sounds Vol. 3. The song peaked to number 31 on Billboard's Hot R&B/Hip-Hop Songs chart.

Charts

References

External links
 http://hiddenbeach.com/promo/jillscott/mylove/
 http://new.music.yahoo.com/jill-scott/tracks/my-love--49498514

2007 singles
Jill Scott (singer) songs
Songs written by Jill Scott (singer)
2007 songs
Hidden Beach Recordings singles
Songs written by Adam Blackstone
Soul ballads
Songs about heartache
Torch songs
Contemporary R&B ballads
2000s ballads